Paul Francis Stewart (born 1 August 1979 in Glasgow) is a Scottish professional football midfielder who is currently without a club following his release from Clyde.

External links

Scottish footballers
Association football midfielders
Clyde F.C. players
Queen of the South F.C. players
Stranraer F.C. players
East Stirlingshire F.C. players
East Fife F.C. players
Queen's Park F.C. players
Scottish Football League players
1979 births
Living people
Footballers from Glasgow